Mykola Skorodynskyi (15 January 1751 – 23 May 1805) was a Ukrainian Greek Catholic hierarch. He was the Eparchial Bishop of the Ruthenian Catholic Eparchy of Lviv, Halych and Kamianets-Podilskyi from 1798 to 1805.

Life 
Born in Zboriv, Polish–Lithuanian Commonwealth (present day Ternopil Oblast, Ukraine) in the family of Ukrainian Greek-Catholic priest Fr. Mykhaylo Skorodynskyi in 1751. He was ordained a priest on 6 January 1782 by Bishop Petro Bilyanskyi. He was a professor in the Lviv University and in the Lviv Theological Seminary and after – vice-rector in the same Seminary. Also served as a vicar general in his native Eparchy (1787–1798).

He was confirmed by the Holy See as an Eparchial Bishop of the Ruthenian Catholic Eparchy of Lviv, Halych and Kamianets-Podilskyi on 28 September 1798. He was consecrated to the Episcopate on 10 March 1799. The principal consecrator was Bishop Porfyriy Skarbek-Vazhynskyi.

He died in Lviv on 23 May 1805.

References 

1751 births
1805 deaths
People from Zboriv
People from Ruthenian Voivodeship
Lviv Seminary alumni
University of Vienna alumni
University of Lviv rectors
18th-century Eastern Catholic bishops
19th-century Eastern Catholic bishops
Bishops of the Uniate Church of the Polish–Lithuanian Commonwealth